Anthony John Paul Duclayan Rosaldo (born February 1, 1994), is a Filipino singer, actor, host and model. He was the season 1 finalist of the singing competition The Clash, winning 6th place. He is currently an artist under GMA Network, dubbed as the “Kapuso Pop Rocker”.

Career

Early career 
Rosaldo started out as a child actor. He first appeared on a 1998 Christmas movie Puso ng Pasko, where he played young Dondi.

His television debut was in 2016, when he joined the Eat Bulaga! segment Spogify Feat. Singing Baes,
 a search for singing heartthrobs. After months of competing, he was selected as one of the 5 grand finalists who eventually became the show's newest boy group. In the same year, Rosaldo released his first single “I Would Give It All” under Ivory Music.

In 2017, Rosaldo represented the Philippines in the world stage. He joined the 21st World Championships of Performing Arts 2017 in Hollywood, California. He brought home 1 gold and 1 bronze medal for singing and 2 gold and 2 silver medals for modeling. Because of the recognition and TV exposures, Anthony booked several local and international shows and concerts including one in Alberta, Canada  and one in Beirut, Lebanon.

Later career 
He joined the first season of the very successful all-original reality singing competition The Clash, where he was one of the grand finalists. He later signed an exclusive management contract with GMA Artist Center (now Sparkle) and was given a recording contract under GMA Music. 
His debut single “Larawan Mo” was released on February 6, 2019. It was well received by audiences. The single has made it to Twitter-trending topics and also topped iTunes PH's charts for a week.    The single's music video  was released starring several celebrities including GMA's leading lady Kris Bernal. It became the local theme song for Emperor; Ruler of The Mask. it has over half a million streams on Spotify.

Continuously working hard on his craft, Rosaldo won Best New Male Singing Performer for the National Customers' Choice Awards 2019 in February 2019. 

His first major concert top billed with Mikee Quintos “Revelation” was held on June 28, 2019 at The Music Museum.          

Following the success of the sold-out concert, he was awarded Best Male Concert Performer at the Best Choice Awards 2019.  

On October 8 2019, he released his 2nd single, “Maghintay Ka Lamang”, a revival which was originally sung by Ted Ito. The single climbed up the iTunes charts and placed 3rd for 2 consecutive days. It was used as the local theme song for “Sky Castle” aired in November 2019. 

Rosaldo renewed his contract with Sparkle in November 2019.   

Despite the struggles with the on-going pandemic, Rosaldo was able to release his 3rd single under GMA Music, “Pwedeng Tayo” penned by Davey Langit, Edwin Marollano, Jonathan Manalo and Vehnee Saturno on July 9,2020. On its release, “Pwedeng Tayo” made it to iTunes PH Top 10 charts. he teamed up with Starstruck season 7 alumna Athena Madrid for the music video, which was released on November 11, 2020.

Rosaldo was then hailed Most Promising Male Recording Artist    at the Guillermo Mendoza Memorial Foundation's 51st Box Office Entertainment Awards.

He is currently a mainstay of variety show All-Out Sundays since 2021, wherein he is a part of the "Men of Kingdom", along with his fellow The Clash finalist Garrett Bolden and its season 2 champion Jeremiah Tiangco, which he named both of his closest friends.

Filmography

Television

Film 

 Puso ng Pasko (1998) - young Dondi

Discography

Singles

Albums

Music Videos

Awards and Nominations

Advertisements

Concerts

References

External links 

 
 Sparkle GMA Artist Center profile 
 

1994 births
Living people
21st-century Filipino male singers
Participants in Philippine reality television series
GMA Network personalities
GMA Music artists
Filipino male television actors
Filipino television variety show hosts